Crosbie Edgerton Saint (September 29, 1936 – May 7, 2018) was a United States Army four-star general who served as Commander in Chief, United States Army Europe/Commander, Central Army Group from 1988 to 1992.

Military career
Saint was born at West Point, New York on September 29, 1936. He was the son of a career soldier, Lieutenant Colonel Frederick Saint, who commanded the 14th Engineer Regiment (PS), a combat engineer unit of the Philippine Scouts of the United States Army, at Fort William McKinley, the Philippine Islands, in the early 1940s. Frederick Saint perished while he was a prisoner of war of the Imperial Japanese Army, following the mass surrender of the Fil-American forces on the Bataan peninsula in April 1942.

The junior Saint graduated from the United States Military Academy in 1958, receiving his commission in Armor.

Saint served two tours in Vietnam, and had five tours with United States Army Europe. His commands included the 11th Armored Cavalry Regiment; Seventh Army Training Command; 1st Armored Division; and III Corps and Fort Hood, Texas.

In 1977 Saint successfully inaugurated AH-64 helicopters into the battle order of the US Army as fully active features in his plans.

Saint led the United States Army Europe as 27th Commander from June 24, 1988 to July 9, 1992.

He retired from the army on September 1, 1992.

Saint's military and civilian education included the Armed Forces Staff College, Army War College, and a Master of Arts degree in International Relations from American University.

Select publications
 
 
  Also available at Google Books.
 
  Available online.

Criticism
In 1985 General Saint, then III Corps Commander at Fort Hood, formed the first consolidated AH-64 attack helicopter brigade at corps level and broke new ground in developing methods of conducting deep operations, based on the Intelligence Preparation of the Battlefield (IPB) concept. General Saint assigned missions to attack helicopter units "to disrupt or destroy enemy forces to a depth of 150 kilometers as the enemy repositions for integration into the close battle." He integrated long range indirect fires, EW assets, and BAl sorties into the deep attack whenever possible. Attack helicopter units conducting deep operations became an integral part of the ground commander's scheme of maneuver to shape the battlefield AH-64 units conducted deep attack missions at nlght to maximize the aircraft's capabilities and take advantage of the enemy's lack of night fiqhting technology. The attack hellcopter units truly became, in Clausewltz's term "a small group of skillful raiders." The success of the deep battle provided a crucial link to fulflll AirLand Battle doctrine.

Post military
After retiring from the military, Saint established a consulting firm specializing in foreign relations and national security issues.
He also served on the Army Science Board, was Vice President, Europe for Military Professional Resources, and at one time sat on the advisory board for the Jewish Institute for National Security Affairs, and the DRS Technologies Board of Directors. He previously served as Chairman, for the Vice President's National Performance Review on Intelligence Support to the Ground Forces. Saint died of congestive heart failure on May 7, 2018 in Bethesda, Maryland at the age of 81.

Personal life 
Saint married and later divorced Virginia Carnahan. He later married Merrilyn Crosgrove. Saint was buried with Full Military Honors on 14 May 2018 at Section: 34, Grave: 654-A  Arlington National Cemetery.

References

Bibliography
 

1936 births
2018 deaths
United States Army generals
United States Military Academy alumni
United States Army personnel of the Vietnam War
American University School of International Service alumni
Recipients of the Defense Distinguished Service Medal
Recipients of the Silver Star
Recipients of the Legion of Merit
Recipients of the Air Medal
Recipients of the Distinguished Flying Cross (United States)
People from West Point, New York
Military personnel from New York (state)